In January 2006, America's two "second-tier" television networks, UPN and The WB, announced they would both cease operations on September 15 and 17, and their operations would be transferred to a new joint-venture "fifth" network, The CW. Meanwhile, Fox Television Stations (which owned several UPN and WB-affiliated stations in large cities that were blocked from affiliating with The CW) signed up with MyNetworkTV, a new "sixth" network owned by then-parent company News Corporation's Fox Entertainment Group.

Background
In January 1995, The WB Television Network and the United Paramount Network (UPN) were launched, each hoping to recreate the success of the Fox network, which had launched in October 1986 and became one of America's "major" networks through the successes of several early series (such as The Simpsons, Married... with Children, The X-Files, Melrose Place, Martin, In Living Color, COPS, Beverly Hills, 90210, and Fox Kids airings of the Mighty Morphin Power Rangers) and its 1993 deal with the National Football League (NFL) to assume the broadcast rights to the National Football Conference (NFC) from CBS. Like with Fox at the time, The WB targeted a mostly teenage and young adult audience; UPN, however, aimed its programming at a broader demographic of adults between 18 and 49 years of age.

All three networks had been joint ventures between major Hollywood studios and large owners of previously independent stations – The WB was owned by the Warner Bros. Entertainment division of Time Warner, in a joint venture with the Tribune Company, and UPN was founded by Chris-Craft Industries, in a programming partnership with Paramount Pictures. In October 1993, Chris-Craft and the Paramount Stations Group reached affiliation agreements with most of the independent stations owned by the respective groups to serve as charter UPN affiliates. That November, Tribune cut affiliation deals with The WB for all eight independent stations it owned at the time (including stations in New York City, Los Angeles and Chicago) – as well as a station in Boston that Tribune bought from the Gannett Company the following year, though only seven would join the network at launch due to the company's Atlanta station affiliating with CBS (its New Orleans station would follow suit in 1996, switching its affiliation to ABC); Chris-Craft and Paramount also each owned independent stations in large and mid-sized markets (with the former owning stations in New York City and Los Angeles).

Both new networks launched to limited fanfare and generally poor results. Over the course of 11½ seasons, despite a number of minor-hit or cult-hit series such as Star Trek: Voyager, Star Trek: Enterprise, Charmed, 7th Heaven, Gilmore Girls, Girlfriends, Buffy the Vampire Slayer, Felicity, Moesha, Dawson's Creek, The Parkers, One on One, Roswell, and Kids' WB's airing of the anime Pokémon, neither network was able to attain the stature that Fox had gained in its first decade, much less that of the longstanding "Big Three" television networks (ABC, CBS and NBC). By early 2006, both networks were losing money, although The WB had been profitable a few seasons earlier; in slight contrast, UPN had never turned a profit and had already lost $800 million in its first five years of operation. Reports indicated that the prospects for both networks were fading quickly.

A further complication was the various shifts in network and affiliate ownership at UPN. Shortly before its launch, Paramount Pictures' corporate parent Paramount Communications was purchased by Viacom, which later purchased a 50% stake in UPN in December 1996, and acquired CBS in 2000. Viacom was permitted to keep interests in both networks, in effect, resulting in the Federal Communications Commission (FCC) lifting its long-standing ban on television station duopolies. Chris-Craft's relations with Viacom were strained in February 2000 when the latter firm exercised a contractual right to force Chris-Craft to either buy Viacom out of UPN, or sell its stake in the network to Viacom within a 45-day grace period. Chris-Craft subsequently filed a lawsuit against Viacom in the New York Supreme Court to block the CBS merger on grounds that a pact reached between Chris-Craft and Viacom in 1997 disallowed either company from owning "any interest, financial or otherwise" in "any competing network" through January 2001; however, New York Supreme Court judge Herman Cahn ruled against Chris-Craft's move for a permanent injunction motion in March 2000. Chris-Craft could not find a suitable partner and sold its interest in UPN to Viacom for $5 million that April. This had the adverse effect of making UPN one of the few networks not to have owned-and operated flagship stations in New York City and Los Angeles, resulting in UPN's de facto owned-and operated flagship stations being located in Philadelphia and San Francisco instead (additionally, UPN never had an O&O in the Chicago market throughout its existence).

Similarly, The WB had the distinction of being the only American broadcast network never to have had an O&O, as although minority owner Tribune operated its core charter stations, Time Warner held majority ownership in the network (with a maximum interest of 77.5%, during the final years of The WB's existence). Time Warner did acquire Atlanta independent station WTBS (which served as the originating feed of then-superstation TBS) through its 1996 merger with the Turner Broadcasting System; however, WATL (which Tribune would acquire in 1999) served as the WB affiliate for that market throughout the network's run.

That August, when Chris-Craft put its television stations – most of them UPN affiliates – up for sale, it sold them to News Corporation's Fox Television Stations subsidiary instead of Viacom. At the time, Fox seemed to be a willing partner in UPN, but made no firm commitment. On September 24, 2003, Fox Television Stations renewed affiliation agreements for its nine UPN stations for three years through 2006. In December 2005, Viacom split into two companies: a new company keeping the Viacom name (which took the original company's film and most of its cable television properties), and CBS Corporation (essentially the old Viacom renamed, which retained the broadcast properties, along with Showtime Networks). In this "split", ownership of UPN went to CBS Corporation.

The new "fifth" and "sixth" networks
On January 24, 2006, CBS Corporation and Time Warner announced they would shut down both UPN and The WB that fall. In place of these two networks, a new "fifth" network that would be jointly owned by both companies, would launch, with a lineup made primarily of the most popular programs from both The WB and UPN. The network was given the name "The CW Television Network" ("CW" representing the first letters in "CBS" and "Warner Bros.").

The CW immediately announced ten-year affiliation agreements with 16 WB affiliates owned by Tribune Broadcasting, and 11 UPN owned-and-operated stations under CBS ownership, giving the new network coverage in all of the top 13 markets and a reach of 48% of the country. The remaining affiliates were to be drawn from the pool of stations affiliated with UPN and The WB. The CW took on The WB's base scheduling model (two hours of prime time programming each Monday through Friday and five hours on Sundays, a two-hour daytime block on weekdays and a five-hour Saturday morning children's block), which was larger in scope compared to UPN, which aired prime time programming only on weekdays and a two-hour repeat block on weekends at the time of the CW announcement.

It was immediately clear that most media markets which had stations that were owned by Tribune would receive the CW affiliation, leaving Fox Television Stations, UPN's second largest affiliate group (after the UPN O&Os owned by CBS Television Stations), without any network programming during primetime hours. Rumors began to circulate that Fox would develop its own network for those affected stations and others left out in the merger. The rumors proved true, and on February 22, 2006, Fox announced the launch of its own network, MyNetworkTV, a programming service meant to fill the two nightly primetime hours that would open up on its UPN and WB-affiliated stations after the start of The CW. Fox also offered the service to other stations.

Stations

Following the CW network announcement, the new network immediately announced ten-year affiliation agreements with the Tribune Company and CBS Television Stations. Tribune committed 16 stations – including its flagship broadcast stations WGN-TV (channel 9) in Chicago; KTLA (channel 5) in Los Angeles; and WPIX (channel 11) in New York City – that were previously affiliated with The WB, while CBS committed 11 of its UPN stations – including WPSG (channel 57) in Philadelphia; KBCW (channel 44) in San Francisco; and WUPA (channel 69) in Atlanta. These stations combined to reach 48% of the United States. Both groups also owned several UPN- and WB-affiliated stations that did not join The CW in overlapping markets. As part of its agreement, Tribune agreed to divest its 22.5% ownership interest in The WB – a decision that the company made in part to avoid shouldering shutdown costs for the network – and did not acquire an interest in The CW.

The CW would eventually reach 95% of all television households in the United States. In markets where both UPN and WB affiliates operated, only one station became a CW affiliate. CW executives were on record as preferring the "strongest" stations viewership-wise among The WB and UPN's existing affiliates. However, as the reorganization was structured not as a merger in the legal sense, but as a new network launching concurrent with the shutdowns of The WB and UPN, The CW was not obligated by existing affiliations with The WB and UPN. It had to negotiate affiliation agreements from scratch with individual stations.

As a result, in some markets, the new CW affiliate was a different station from either the former WB and UPN stations. In Helena, Montana, Ion Television affiliate KMTF (channel 10; now PBS member station KUHM-TV) became a CW station. In Las Vegas, Nevada, independent station KFBT (channel 33, now KVCW) chose to affiliate with The CW. In Honolulu, Hawaii, The CW did not become available in the market until early December 2006, where it was carried on a digital subchannel of local Fox affiliate KHON-TV (channel 2). The network also affiliated with some digital channels, mainly newly launched subchannels of a local Big Four affiliate, in several markets.

Under the new network, a new service called The CW Plus began serving Nielsen markets with rankings of 100 and lower, featuring a pre-supplied master schedule of programs acquired from the syndication market in addition to CW network programming. The CW Plus is structured similarly to The WB 100+ Station Group, which supplied locally branded WB-affiliated cable channels. In most cases, distribution for The CW Plus covers not only cable but broadcast television as well, including the digital subchannels discussed above.

On March 1, 2006, five stations – four WB affiliates and one UPN affiliate – were the first outside the core CBS and Tribune stations to sign affiliation deals with The CW. By May 18, 2006, 174 stations had signed agreements to become affiliates of The CW, reaching 105 million households and covering 95.3% of the country (the latter two figures excluding the CW stations in Puerto Rico and the U.S. Virgin Islands).

Station groups that signed up a large number of their stations as CW affiliates included Pappas Telecasting Companies, ACME Communications and Sinclair Broadcast Group, although many other large groups, including Hearst-Argyle Television, Clear Channel Communications and Belo Corporation had signed up selected stations. Sinclair signed deals to carry the network in early May, despite reservations with The CW's reported demands for reverse compensation.

While WGN-TV in Chicago became a charter affiliate of The CW, its former national counterpart WGN America never aired programs from The CW through a formal affiliation when it operated as WGN-TV's out-of-market superstation feed prior to December 2014 (although it did carry reruns of select CW series in marathon form in 2013), as the network has sufficient enough affiliate coverage that The CW did not need to use the national WGN feed to carry its programming; WGN America had previously carried WB programming from that network's January 1995 launch until October 1999, when Tribune Broadcasting and Time Warner mutually decided that The WB's national broadcast coverage had increased to a level that allowed the WGN national feed to discontinue carrying the network.

Several affiliates changed their call letters to reflect their new affiliation with The CW (e.g. KPWB-TV (Des Moines) to KCWI, WNPA-TV (Pittsburgh) to WPCW-TV, WJWB (Jacksonville) to WCWJ, WHCP (Portsmouth, Ohio, serving the Charleston, West Virginia market) to WQCW, WEWB (Albany, New York) to WCWN, KWCV (Wichita, Kansas) to KSCW, WBDC (Washington, D.C.) to WDCW, KBHK (San Francisco) to KBCW, and KHWB (Houston) to KHCW). Some stations, however, retained call signs that referred to UPN and The WB, such as WUPA in Atlanta and KWBA-TV in Tucson, Arizona, respectively. In August 2006, CBS Corporation's CW stations dropped all references to UPN from their branding.

Due to the availability of "instant duopoly" digital subchannels, and the overall lack of a need to settle for a secondary affiliation with shows aired in problematic timeslots, both The CW and MyNetworkTV launched with far greater national coverage than that enjoyed by UPN and The WB when they started in 1995. For several years, UPN had coverage gaps in the top 30 markets, and by 2005 had only managed to reach 86% of the population. This resulted in secondary affiliations with other networks (with some dual WB-UPN affiliates airing the latter network's programming immediately after The WB's primetime lineup, and vice versa) and diluted ratings when programs were shown out of their intended timeslots, or the lack of the program airing at all (a problem experienced by many Star Trek fans with Star Trek: Voyager and Star Trek: Enterprise).

Repercussions

Comparisons to 1994 realignment
The WB and UPN were the first major television networks to shut down since the collapse of the DuMont Television Network in 1956, although other small broadcast television networks have also ceased operations over the years. Given the merger of the two networks to create The CW (as well as the eventual launch of MyNetworkTV and the proliferation of digital subchannels), the scope of the realignment caused the largest single shakeup in American broadcast television since the Fox/New World Communications alliance of 1994, which preceded the subsequent launches of UPN and The WB the following year that drastically reduced the number of independent television stations in the U.S., some of which had been marketed and distributed as superstations as recently as the mid-1990s.

While The CW's debut affected more markets, unlike the Fox/New World deal of the mid-1990s, it was unlikely to cause the same degree of viewer confusion as almost no affiliates of the four major networks dropped those affiliations to become CW affiliates. Only two former Big Four affiliates switched their primary affiliation, in both cases from Fox to MyNetworkTV:
 In the Jackson, Mississippi, market, Fox affiliate WUFX (channel 35) swapped affiliations with sister station (and the market's original Fox affiliate) WDBD (channel 40; The WB) in the summer before joining MyNetworkTV the following season after three seasons with Fox. Unrelated UPN affiliate WRBJ (channel 34), which signed on the air in early 2006, joined The CW.
 In the Fort Smith-Fayetteville, Arkansas, market, low-power Fox affiliate KPBI-CA (channel 46) switched to MyNetworkTV (along with KPBI (TV), channel 34). Fox had moved its affiliation to full-power KFTA-TV (channel 24), formerly a satellite of NBC affiliate KNWA-TV (channel 51). None of the three stations that were available (the two KPBI's and UPN affiliate KFDF-CA (channel 10)) joined The CW; they were all owned by Equity Broadcasting, which shunned The CW in every one of its markets (KFDF-CA joined the Equity-owned Retro Television Network instead). The CW would finally come to the market the following year on a cable-only channel available via Cox Communications (and eventually on digital subchannels of the market's ABC affiliate, KHBS/KHOG-TV, channels 40 and 29). Equity would eventually declare bankruptcy in 2009 due to a number of factors involving the digital transition and problems with RTV which led it to losing control of that network to Luken Communications.

There were several other cases where Big Four affiliates picked up The CW, MyNetworkTV, or both as a secondary affiliation on their main channel or as a digital subchannel affiliation, even in markets where viable non-network affiliate stations remained.

Network affiliation repercussions
In media markets where there were separate affiliates of The WB and UPN, one local station was left out in the merger. Many of these stations signed with MyNetworkTV including the vast majority of the Fox stations acquired in the 2001 acquisition of BHC Communications (the former Chris-Craft stations). Additionally, MyNetworkTV signed with three Tribune stations that did not take the CW affiliation: WPHL (channel 17) in Philadelphia, WATL (channel 36) in Atlanta and KTWB (channel 20) in Seattle. Tribune had indicated interest in Fox-developed programming blocks such as MyNetworkTV for stations that did not pick up the CW affiliation; the company announced on May 15 that the aforementioned stations would join MyNetworkTV. In contrast, CBS initially seemed more hostile to MyNetworkTV, and announced its remaining UPN affiliates – KTXA (channel 21) in the Dallas/Fort Worth metroplex, WSBK-TV (channel 38) in Boston, WBFS-TV (channel 33) in Miami/Fort Lauderdale, and WUPL (channel 54) in New Orleans as well as WB affiliate WTCN-CA (channel 50) in West Palm Beach – would all become independent stations. Four of the five stations, excluding KTXA, eventually all joined MyNetworkTV.

Some stations bypassed by The CW that did not take MyNetworkTV instead opted to become (or revert to) independent stations. For example, the two remaining former Viacom-owned UPN stations – WSBK and KTXA – reverted to their roots as independent stations (the latter was constrained to independence in any event due to Fox-owned KDFI (channel 27), affiliating with MyNetworkTV). As a consequence, in three of the top 10 media markets – Boston, Dallas/Fort Worth and San Francisco – programs from The WB, UPN and MyNetworkTV were all available to viewers from September 5 to 17. MyNetworkTV affiliated with longtime former independent stations WZMY (channel 50) in Derry, New Hampshire (serving the Boston market) and KDFI, while in San Francisco the network affiliated with former longtime NBC affiliate KRON-TV (channel 4; WB affiliate KBWB channel 20, reverted to independent status). Other stations elected to become (or revert to) independent stations as well, particularly in situations where either more than two non-major network affiliate stations existed or another station picked up an affiliation with The CW or MyNetworkTV via a digital subchannel.

Additionally, four former UPN affiliates became affiliates of "Big Four" networks themselves:
 WJKT (channel 16) in Jackson, Tennessee, and the digital subchannel of WBOC in Salisbury, Maryland, joined Fox on August 21, 2006.
 WLQP-LP (channel 25) in Lima, Ohio, became the local ABC affiliate on September 1, 2006.
 WSWG (channel 44) in Valdosta, Georgia, became a CBS affiliate and added MyNetworkTV as a digital subchannel on September 4.
Additionally, while some stations joined newly established or lesser-known broadcast networks such as RTV), whose now-defunct parent company Equity Broadcasting did not commit any of its WB affiliates to The CW, other stations (mainly digital subchannels, cable channels such as those that were WB 100+ cable channels, and struggling low-power stations) which received neither The CW nor the MyNetworkTV affiliation opted instead to cease operations entirely. For example, in Dayton, Ohio, the "UPN17" cable channel run by CBS affiliate WHIO-TV (channel 7) closed down at the end of 2006.

Despite the launch of The CW on September 18, 2006, many households around the country were not able to see the new network when it premiered because stations in several markets, primarily those that chose to carry The CW on a digital subchannel of the station's primary affiliate, were unsuccessful in trying to strike a deal with Time Warner Cable to carry their CW subchannels on basic cable lineups, despite the fact that The CW was 50% owned by the provider's then-parent company Time Warner. These markets included Cincinnati; Honolulu; Charleston, South Carolina; El Paso; Corpus Christi; Palm Springs and Lima, Ohio. In late 2006, the Honolulu, El Paso and Palm Springs affiliates were made available on TWC systems in those markets.

Network transition repercussions
After the conclusion of the May 2006 sweeps period, as both The WB and UPN started shutting down, both programming schedules and on-screen graphics were affected, and on August 14, 2006 both networks stopped inserting their logo bugs into prime time programming in order to allow CW affiliates-to-be to add lower thirds and bugs promoting the new network during this time – this practice was automatically used on WB affiliates' primetime programming.

Also on August 14, 2006, UPN discontinued all promotional advertising for its programs during network time periods (except for audition promotions for America's Next Top Model that aired during that program), though some local stations still aired promos for the network's shows. The network also stopped customizing the closing credits of its shows to the network's standardized graphics scheme (perhaps in reaction to affiliate preemptions, see below), instead showing the program's studio credits full-screen with theme music intact (save for ANTM, where previews for the next episode and casting calls for future CW cycles were shown on the left side of the screen with the studio credits on the right). In contrast, at The WB, advertising for its shows continued during network time periods, with promos for The CW mixed in, and the network's standard closing credits format remained unchanged with promos in the upper two-thirds of the screen and credits in the lower third.

The networks also filled spare timeslots with low-cost movies on some weeks (including UPN on Wednesday night and The WB during its infamous "Friday night death slot"), and reruns and unaired episodes of long-cancelled programs, such as the sketch comedy series Blue Collar TV on Wednesday nights, and repeat and unaired episodes of the dramedy Just Legal on Sunday nights (both on The WB). Prior to the MyNetworkTV announcement, many stations (including those snubbed by The CW) had reportedly begun to search for new programming to fill empty timeslots, which had been likely to further boost the fortunes of the syndication industry. Ironically, one of those syndicated offerings, Desire, eventually became part of MyNetworkTV's fall 2006 schedule.

Other affiliate repercussions
Following the CW announcement, the fate of many WB and UPN affiliates changed drastically. On January 27, 2006, KQEG-CA (channel 23) in La Crosse, Wisconsin dropped its UPN affiliation, becoming the first station to disaffiliate from a partner network due to the CW announcement; it retained its FamilyNet affiliation.

Many affected affiliates took similar measures. Following the May 2006 sweeps period, many stations began to pre-empt UPN and WB programming for a variety of reasons. In the Green Bay/Appleton market, future MyNetworkTV affiliate WACY (channel 32), on June 5, opted to replace programs that aired during UPN's second hour of primetime (except for Veronica Mars) whenever possible with infomercials. In Cincinnati, eventual independent station WBQC-LP (channel 25) moved its UPN programming on July 4 to between 2:00 and 4:00 a.m. early Tuesday to Saturday morning, with the intention of promoting the station's "Independence Day" programming in its place.

Another eventual independent station, KPNZ (channel 24) in Salt Lake City, dropped UPN programming in June 2006 with no replacement affiliate for the remaining two months (KPNZ is now an owned-and-operated station of Spanish-language network Estrella TV). In Springfield, Massachusetts, WB 100+ cable channel WBQT was at one point referred as a CW affiliate on the official website and even started advertising as such, but due to a lack of confirmation, the channel's call letters (which were fictional as WB 100+ stations were not licensed by the FCC due to being cable-only services) were removed. However, on August 29, 2006, WBQT signed a formal affiliation agreement with The CW as a member channel of The CW Plus. In 2015, WBQT was dissolved, with The CW Plus moving over-the-air to NBC affiliate WWLP's second subchannel.

Before the merger, the cash-strapped Granite Broadcasting Corporation had reached an agreement to sell its WB affiliates in San Francisco and Detroit to AM Media, a unit of private-equity firm Acon Investments. With The CW choosing to affiliate with CBS-owned UPN stations in those markets, the Granite-AM Media deal eventually collapsed, and Granite responded by deciding to instead sell the stations to DS Audible, LLC, for a lesser price. Granite later announced that it would sue CBS and Time Warner over the failed deal. On July 18, 2006, the deal to sell to DS Audible also fell apart, and on December 11, 2006, Granite filed for Chapter 11 bankruptcy reorganization after missing an interest payment on its $400 million+ debt. Granite emerged from bankruptcy in June 2007 under control of Silver Point Capital, which also took over another bankrupt broadcasting company, Communications Corporation of America (a key Fox affiliate group in smaller markets within the Southern U.S.), later that year. As of 2019, Granite has since sold both stations to separate parties.

In New Orleans, CBS filed a lawsuit against Belo, owner of market-dominant CBS affiliate WWL-TV (channel 4), in February 2006 over allegations that Belo tried to renege on the terms of buying WUPL after Tribune-owned WNOL (channel 38) was named the market's CW affiliate (but before WUPL's affiliation with MyNetworkTV was announced). The deal, already complicated in the aftermath of Hurricane Katrina which caused catastrophic damage to much of the Greater New Orleans area, would have created a duopoly between WWL-TV and WUPL with both stations merging into WWL's longtime studios on Rampart Street in New Orleans' French Quarter. All matters were eventually settled, and the deal closed in February 2007. However, the Belo purchase of WUPL delayed that station's transition to high definition until mid-2010 as the secondary master controls for WUPL at the WWL-TV facility were only capable of pillarboxed 4:3 standard definition broadcasts until the recent upgrades took place (the Gannett Company purchased WUPL and WWL-TV in 2013 as part of their acquisition of Belo, and has since been spun off to Gannett's broadcasting successor, Tegna).

UPN and The WB closures

UPN
UPN quietly ceased operations on Friday, September 15, 2006, with its usual airing of WWE Friday Night SmackDown!; in addition, some stations aired the network's usual, but optional, weekend repeat block. The low-key closure was not surprising given that in nine media markets, including the three largest, UPN was not available because the local affiliates were owned by Fox Television Stations and switched to its new network, MyNetworkTV, on September 5. UPN programs stopped airing on WPWR (channel 50) in Chicago and KUTP (channel 45) in Phoenix on September 1, and on the other seven Fox-owned stations (including WWOR-TV (channel 9) in New York City and KCOP (channel 13) in Los Angeles) the day before, August 31.

Several CW affiliates began airing SmackDown! and some other CW-renewed UPN programming a few weeks early to replace UPN affiliates that had switched to MyNetworkTV. Otherwise, it was unclear whether MyNetworkTV affiliates would air UPN or WB programs at all. Additionally, Tribune-owned Fox affiliate WXMI (channel 17) in Grand Rapids, Michigan aired Smackdown on tape delay between WXSP-CA (channel 15)'s switch to MyNetworkTV and the launch of WWMT (channel 3)'s digital subchannel as the local CW affiliate.

The WB
The WB closed on Sunday, September 17, with The Night of Favorites and Farewells, a five-hour block of pilot episodes of the network's past signature series, including Felicity, Angel, Buffy the Vampire Slayer (which was a two-hour episode) and Dawson's Creek. Commercial breaks shown on the network that evening featured re-airings of past image campaigns and network promotions, promo spots given to cable networks that carried these shows in off-network syndication, as well as ads for each series' TV-on-DVD box set.

After its final commercial break, a montage featuring stars of several of The WB's shows over the years was broadcast just prior to the network's shutdown, ending with a silhouette of former mascot Michigan J. Frog taking a final bow. This was followed by the studio credits for the pilot of Dawson's Creek; the credits for the other three pilots that aired were shown in the network's standardized credits format. The final night of WB programming netted relatively low ratings, mustering only a share of 2, meaning just 2% of viewers were tuned into The WB on its final night. The reasoning for the low ratings was due to the fact that WB affiliates in certain areas had already affiliated with MyNetworkTV at that network's launch, which rendered The WB's programming unavailable in these markets during its final two weeks of broadcasting. It also aired against the second ever game (a Cowboys–Washington rivalry game at Texas Stadium) of NBC Sunday Night Football, assuring fewer viewers due to the curiosity of the NFL's prime game now being on Sunday evenings.

That evening, after The WB shut down, some Tribune-owned affiliates that would join The CW when it launched the following night acknowledged the pending switchover within their newscasts, with most adopting their new CW station brands immediately. WPIX in New York City aired a montage of all of the logos used throughout the station's history leading up to the introduction of its new "CW11" logo before the start of its 10:00 p.m. newscast, while KHCW (channel 39) in Houston aired a retrospective of the station's history during its 9:00 p.m. news. In Dallas–Fort Worth, KDAF (channel 33) had retitled its primetime newscast to CW33 News at Nine immediately following the end of WB programming, and featured a video clip of the signage being changed outside the station's studios (however, the old WB33 News at Nine bumper aired upon returning from the first commercial break that night).

Post-realignment

The CW 
Since 2006, The CW and MyNetworkTV have struggled significantly in the Nielsen ratings, despite The CW showing initial signs of promise. The CW has usually finished fifth in the Nielsen ratings, even falling behind Spanish-language network Univision at times, though it has come close to beating out NBC (which had similar ratings challenges beginning in the 2004–05 television season, before moderating in the 2012–13 season) on several occasions. However, The CW has had some successful series (by the standards of the network's viewership, which has rarely peaked above 4 million viewers for a single episode), such as Gossip Girl, The Vampire Diaries and Arrow. Additionally in 2008, concerns regarding the future of The CW led Tribune to begin rebranding its CW affiliates in a way that deemphasized its network affiliation, and another major CW affiliate ownership group, Pappas Telecasting Companies, cited The CW's poor performance as a factor in its Chapter 11 bankruptcy filing. Pappas has since wound down operations, while most of Tribune's CW stations (with the exceptions of WPIX and KTLA, the latter of which only includes network references in promos for CW shows) began reincorporating references to their CW affiliation beginning in 2011.

The merger of UPN and The WB to form The CW has led to instability of the airings of WWE SmackDown, which had aired on UPN for its first seven years. After September 26, 2008, WWE Friday Night SmackDown left The CW for MyNetworkTV in large part due to The CW's newfound focus on targeting 18- to 34-year-old female viewers, though WWE would later air the short-lived WWE Saturday Morning Slam on The CW Saturday mornings. SmackDown eventually moved to cable as part of WWE's contract with NBCUniversal for its other programs, initially to Syfy in October 2010, prompted by a move back to Thursday nights in November 2014 (where it had originally aired before 2005), then to USA Network (longtime home to WWE Raw, save for a five-year period on The New TNN/Spike TV from 2000 to 2005) in January 2016, followed again by another move only six months later—this time to Tuesday nights—as part of the 2nd brand extension. SmackDown returned to broadcast television on Fox in October 2019, accompanied by a return to Friday nights, as part of Fox's emphasis on sports and live event programming due in part of the sale of much of 21st Century Fox to The Walt Disney Company. The move of SmackDown back to broadcast television also poses a potential conflict of interest with Fox's largest affiliate group, the Sinclair Broadcast Group, which purchased rival wrestling promotion Ring of Honor in 2011 after SmackDown had moved to cable.

In September 2008, The CW outsourced its five-hour Sunday block to Media Rights Capital (MRC) in order to concentrate on its weekday schedule. The MRC-programmed Sunday lineup performed poorly in the ratings and was replaced by reruns and movies programmed by the network that November; The CW eventually gave back its Sunday primetime slots to the network's local affiliates in September 2009, reducing its prime time programming to weeknights only (and the network's programming to six days a week overall, when its Saturday morning children's lineup and weekday daytime block is accounted). The CW's ratings struggles eventually subsided in later years: the network beat NBC for the first time in the key demographic of Adults 18–49 for a single calendar night on November 21, 2013. Other recent series successes (including the revival of the U.S. version of the improv comedy series Whose Line Is It Anyway?, The Flash and Jane the Virgin) helped The CW increase its ratings year-over-year by the 2014–15 season – at which point, The CW posted its highest season average total viewership since the 2007–08 season with 2.15 million.

MyNetworkTV 
Since its launch, MyNetworkTV has struggled to gain an audience. In 2009, it was announced that the network would convert to a syndicated programming service, and since SmackDown moved to Syfy in October 2010, MyNetworkTV has been devoid of first-run programming other than that shared with syndicators, and can be more fairly compared to Ion Television, which also carries the same type of scheduling pattern, on a broader all-day basis.

In many markets (mainly in smaller and lower-tier mid-sized markets), it now shares channel space with other full-time subchannel networks such as Antenna TV or MeTV and is more apt to air out of prime time on several affiliates (in Monroe, Louisiana, for instance, after their first affiliate left the airwaves completely and their second affiliate ended carriage to become a full-time religious station, it now is carried in the graveyard slot on a CW Plus subchannel of KNOE-TV, mainly to overlay dead time that would only be filled with paid programming). In September 2015, West Coast flagship KCOP-TV in Los Angeles moved MyNetworkTV programming to late night, both replacing it with lower-tier entertainment newsmagazines in primetime, and freeing Fox sister station KTTV of any in-house competition in primetime, though it returned to primetime after those programs flopped, until the summer of 2021, when it resumed airing MyNetworkTV in late night. In Chicago, WPWR-TV moved the lineup to nearly out of primetime on September 1, 2016, upon assuming the CW affiliation from WGN-TV which became an independent station. WPWR-TV would lose its affiliation with the CW in September 2019 and the network's programs would move to WCIU-TV, but retained the same scheduling of MyNetworkTV programming. A similar move happened in Cleveland in July 2018 when MyNetworkTV affiliate WUAB unexpectedly assumed the CW affiliation from WBNX-TV while keeping its MyNetworkTV affiliation in the late-night hours temporarily; it was eventually bumped to sister station WOIO's MeTV subchannel in January 2019, immediately after Gray Television assumed ownership over the former Raycom Media stations.

See also
 1994–1996 United States broadcast television realignment
 Repercussions of the 1994–1996 United States broadcast television realignment

Footnotes

United States broadcast realignment
United States broadcast TV realignment
The CW
UPN
The WB
MyNetworkTV

Nexstar Media Group

History of television in the United States